African Sambo Championships are the main championships in Sambo and Combat Sambo, organized by the African Sambo Confederation.

References 

African Sambo Championships